The phrase "The Beautiful Game" is a synonym for association football.

The Beautiful Game may also refer to:

The Beautiful Game, also known as The Match, a 2001 film
The Beautiful Game (2012 film), a documentary film about association football in Africa
The Beautiful Game (upcoming film), a British film directed by Thea Sharrock
The Beautiful Game (musical), a musical by Andrew Lloyd Webber and Ben Elton
The Beautiful Game (album), the tenth full-length album by an English smooth jazz band Acoustic Alchemy
The Beautiful Game (compilation album), a multi-artist album released in 1996 to commemorate the UEFA Euro 1996 football cup.
Beautiful Game Studios, a computer game development studio based in London
The Beautiful Game, a 2016 album by American band Vulfpeck